Robert Morey may refer to:

Robert Morey (baseball) (born 1988), American baseball player
Robert Morey (pastor) (1946–2019), American Christian evangelical pastor
Robert Morey (rower) (1936–2019), American Olympic rower

See also
Robert Moray (1608/09–1673), Scottish philosopher
Robert Murray (disambiguation)